There are 13 national holidays celebrated in the Republic of Guinea, a country in West Africa. Employees must be given the day off with pay or another day off in lieu of pay.

Public holidays

References

External links
 http://www.worldtravelguide.net/guinea/public-holidays

Guinean culture
Guinea
Guinea